DeWitt is a village in DeWitt County, Illinois, United States. The population was 160 at the 2020 census. The U.S. Census Bureau and the USGS list the village's name as De Witt, although the name DeWitt (no space) is used locally and by the U.S. Postal Service.

History
DeWitt was originally called Marion, and under the latter name was platted in 1836. The present name is for DeWitt Clinton, governor of New York, 1817-1823.

Geography
DeWitt is located just off of Rt. 54.

Demographics
As of the 2020 census there were 160 people, 85 households, and 59 families residing in the village. The racial makeup of the village was 96.88% White, 0.63% Asian, 0.63% from other races, and 1.88% from two or more races. Hispanic or Latino of any race were 1.25% of the population.

There were 85 households, out of which 67.06% had children under the age of 18 living with them, 61.18% were married couples living together, 3.53% had a female householder with no husband present, and 30.59% were non-families. 30.59% of all households were made up of individuals, and 15.29% had someone living alone who was 65 years of age or older. The average household size was 3.31 and the average family size was 2.60.

The village's age distribution consisted of 28.5% under the age of 18, none from 18 to 24, 14.6% from 25 to 44, 40.7% from 45 to 64, and 16.3% who were 65 years of age or older. The median age was 50.0 years. For every 100 females, there were 75.4 males. For every 100 females age 18 and over, there were 110.7 males.

The median income for a household in the village was $51,875, and the median income for a family was $59,688. Males had a median income of $54,167 versus $17,237 for females. The per capita income for the village was $23,340. About 13.6% of families and 16.3% of the population were below the poverty line, including 22.2% of those under age 18 and 8.3% of those age 65 or over.

References

Villages in DeWitt County, Illinois